Princess Maria Theresia of Liechtenstein (Maria Theresia Anna Felicitas; 11 May 1694 – 20 February 1772) was the heiress to the Silesian Duchy of Troppau (now Opava in Czech Republic). Countess of Soissons by marriage, she was the last person to hold the title. She had one son who predeceased her in 1734. Her son was engaged to Maria Teresa Cybo-Malaspina, duchess of Massa and heiress to the Principality of Carrara.

Biography

Maria Theresia's father was Prince Hans-Adam I of Liechtenstein – who had purchased the counties of Vaduz and Schellenberg, which is now the modern state of Liechtenstein (although the first Prince to visit Vaduz did so only in 1844). Her mother, Erdmuthe Maria Theresia of Dietrichstein was the great-granddaughter of Adam von Dietrichstein (1527–1590), Hofmeister to the court of Emperor Rudolf II and buried in St Vitus Cathedral, Prague Castle.

Maria Theresia’s father died in 1712 – and both her brothers before that.

In Vienna on 24 October 1713, Maria Theresia married Thomas Emmanuel, Count of Soissons and Governor of Antwerp (born on 8 December 1687), second son of Louis Thomas of Savoy-Carignano and his wife, Uranie de La Cropte de Beauvais (1655-1717). They had one son, Eugenio Giovanni.

Through this marriage she also became a Princess of Savoy, having married into a cadet branch of the reigning Dukes of Savoy, Kings of Sicily (13 July 1713) and later of Sardinia. Her husband was a descendant of the princes of Carignano, which had been raised by Charles Emmanuel I, Duke of Savoy, into a principality as an appanage for his third son, Thomas Francis. The house of Carignano developed two junior branches, those of Soissons and Villafranca.

In 1662, the town of Yvois in the Ardennes was raised by Louis XIV of France into a duchy in his favour, its name being changed at the same time to Carignan, to remember Carignano. The Prince Eugene of Savoy was the second son of the first Duke of Carignan and grandson of the first Prince of Carignano.

Prince Eugene was Thomas Emmanuel’s uncle. Eugene served under Leopold I, Holy Roman Emperor – and for his leadership at the Battle of Vienna (against the Turks) in 1683 he became known as "The Atlas of the Austrian monarchy". In 1697, as Field Marshal and chief of Austrian armies, he defeated the forces of the Ottoman sultan, Mustafa II, at the decisive Battle of Zenta (now Senta in Serbia) in Hungary.

After her husband died in Vienna on 28 December 1729, Maria Theresia made Škvorec Castle her seat.

On 20 February 1772 Maria Theresia died in Vienna. She was a descendant of Georg Hartmann who had become Lutheran c. 1540, while her great-grandfather, Karl, a stattholder of Bohemia had found it wise to become a Catholic in 1599.

Maria Theresa’s son, Eugene Jean Francois, Count of Soissons and Duke of Troppau (born 23 September 1714; died at Mannheim on 24 November 1734) had died at only 20 years old, thus her estate passed to Franz Joseph I, Prince of Liechtenstein – great-grandson of Prince Hartmann III of Liechtenstein (1613–1686). The title of Count of Soissons became extinct with the young son’s death and was returned to the French crown.

Issue

Eugène Jean François de Savoie (Eugene John Francis; 23 September 1714 – 24 November 1734); married Maria Teresa Cybo-Malaspina by proxy, but died 13 days after without issue.

Ancestry

1694 births
1772 deaths
Liechtenstein princesses
Princesses of Savoy
German princesses
Bohemian nobility
Countesses of Soissons
17th-century German people
18th-century German people
18th-century Liechtenstein women
Burials at St. Stephen's Cathedral, Vienna
Daughters of monarchs